You're Only Young Twice is a 1952 British comedy film directed by Terry Bishop and starring Duncan Macrae, Joseph Tomelty, Patrick Barr, Charles Hawtrey and Diane Hart. It was based on the play What Say They? by James Bridie. The film was produced by the government backed Group 3 Films and shot at Southall Studios with sets designed by the art director Ray Simm.

Premise
A young woman visiting a Scottish university in search of her uncle, who is in hiding from the authorities, is mistaken for the principal's secretary, so she pursues the impersonation.

Cast
 Duncan Macrae as Professor Hayman
 Joseph Tomelty as Dan McEntee / Connell O'Grady (writer)
 Patrick Barr as Sir Archibald Asher
 Charles Hawtrey as Adolphus Hayman, President of Temperance Society
 Diane Hart as Ada Shore / posing as "Miss Lamplighter" (pending new principal's secretary)
 Robert Urquhart as Sheltie
 Edward Lexy as Lord Carshennie
 Roddy McMillan as Mr Milligan, President of Students' Union Council
 Jacqueline Mackenzie as Nellie
 Eric Woodburn as the Bedellus
 Molly Urquhart as Lady Duffy
 Ronnie Corbett as Mr Freddie Mather, President of the Men's Union
 Reginald Beckwith as BBC Commentator

Production
John Grierson, head of Group 3, thought it had "some of the fastest and best dialogue in a generation."

Critical reception
The Radio Times has described it as a "theatrical comedy," which was "shakily brought to the screen...the story involves mistaken identity, Celtic poetry, horse racing and the rigging of Rectorial elections. Blink and you'll miss Ronnie Corbett in what, of course, can only be described as a small role."

References

Bibliography
 Harper, Sue & Porter, Vincent. British Cinema of the 1950s: The Decline of Deference. Oxford University Press, 2007.

External links

1952 films
1952 comedy films
1950s English-language films
British comedy films
Films directed by Terry Bishop
British films based on plays
British black-and-white films
1950s British films